Hallway Productionz is a 3x Grammy Nominated, Dove Award-winning music production duo made up of producer/mixer/engineer/multi-instrumentalist Teak & Dee Underdue. The pair reside in Stockton, California. Teak and Dee's production is most notably featured on Ice Cube, WC, T-Bone, Angie Stone, Dave Hollister, Mindless Behavior & Blackalicious records.

Production credits

2002
Blackalicious – Blazing Arrow (2002)
- Purest Love (piano, bass guitar, guitar, trumpet)

2003
Dead Prez- Turn off the Radio: The Mixtape Vol. 2: Get Free or Die Tryin' (2003)
Coming of Age

Lyrics Born-Later That Day (2003)
One Session (co-writer, keyboards)
Stop Complaining (trumpet, keyboards)

MSN March Madness Basketball commercial (2003)
bass guitar, keyboards, trumpet, flugelhorn

Lifesavas-Spirit in Stone (2003)
Soldierfied (Guitar)
Emerged (Bass guitar, Guitar)

2004
Keak Da Sneak & Dopegame Presents Dope Game (2004)
Bring It Ta Ya pt. 1
G's Up featuring Allen Anthony
Gangsta Team featuring The Team
Bring It Ta Ya pt. 2

Maroons-Ambush (2004)
Ambush 
Matter of Time
If
Best of Me
Best of Me (Bonus Beat)
365
First Draw
(bass guitar, guitar, keyboards, trumpet)

Diz – It's My Turn (2004)
It's My Turn featuring E-40

"Terrell Carter-Terrell" (2004)
Thinking About You

2005
Ice Cube-xXx: State of the Union Soundtrack & Movie (2005)
Anybody Seen the Popo's?!

T-Bone-Bone-A-Fide (2005)
Let That Thang Go
I Been Looking Around

Blackalicious-The Craft (2005)
Supreme People
Powers
Your Move
Lotus Flower featuring George Clinton (funk musician)
Side to Side
Ego Sonic War Drums
-co-writer on these tracks. bass guitar & synths on entire album

Lyrics Born-Same !@#$ Different Day (2005)
Pack Up Remix featuring Evidence, Dilated Peoples, KRS-One
I'm Just Raw
Shake It Off (Bad Dreams Part II)
I Can't Wait For Your Love (Limited Time Offer)
bass guitar & Keyboards on these songs

 Rah Muzic Presents – Dope Game 2 (2005)
Dope Game Mobsters
In The Dope Game

"BA-BA Sports" (2005)
Put Ya Ring Back on featuring Yukmouth, Allen Anthony, Keak Da Sneak

Sophia Maria-Oh My My (2005)
Oh My My

2006
Ice Cube – Laugh Now, Cry Later' (2006)
Child Support
The Game Lord
D**k Tease featuring Fat Man Scoop
Look Where You At (Unreleased)

Lyrics Born – Overnite Encore: Lyrics Born Live (2006)
Knock Knock

Yukmouth & Killa Klump-Killa Thugs (2006)
Aint No
Yada Yada Boyz
Get it Popin
Talkn Bout featuring Keak da Sneak
Cakin Up
New Circumstances
Talk Bout Me
Boss
Gunz Up
Aint No Love
Neck Straight

"Waist Deep (soundtrack) & Waist Deep movie (2006)
Child Support by Ice Cube

"Bear-The Bear Necessities" (2006)
Produced entire album except "Beautiful"

2007
WC – Guilty by Affiliation (2007)
West Coast Voodoo featuring The Game (rapper) & Ice Cube
Guilty By Affiliation
Crazy Toones 4 President
If You See A Bad Bitch
80's Babies featuring Ice Cube
Addicted To It

"Mister Sniper-Freedom Writers" movie (2007)
Change featuring T-Bone (rapper)

"T-Bone-Bone-Appetit!"
Name Droppin featuring Eric Dawkin

"Ice Cube-In The Movies" (2007)
Anybody Seen The Popos?!

2008
Ice Cube – Raw Footage (2008)
Hood Mentality featuring Angie Stone
Why Me? featuring Musiq Soulchild
Cold Places
Thank God

Ice Cube-The Essentials (2008)
Cold Places

Young Maylay – The Real Coast Guard (2008)
Necklace Jumpin (West Or Nothin)
Rock The Beat
You Ain't Uh
Every Thang Is Gonna Be Alright featuring WC & Traci Nelson

"Ren Da Heat Monsta of Doja Clik-"Da Mudville King" (Doja Clik Presents)" (2008)
Talkn About Me featuring Turf Talk & E-40
West Up feat. WC & Dj Crazy Toones
Reflections
Put It on Me featuring Too Short
Officer Down

"The Tones-Dreamtalk (2008)
Searching

2009
"Ledisi-Turn Me Loose" (2009)
Runnin' (bass guitar, guitar, synthesizers)
Grammy Nominated Album

"Poison Pen-The Money Shot" (2009)
2nd Amendment featuring Immortal Technique
Finished

2010
Y'Anna Crawley (2010)
"I Believe"  & "Lookin' Towards Heaven"

Lyrics Born-As U Were (2010)
"We Live by the Beat"
co-producers

E-40 – Revenue Retrievin': Night Shift (2010)
Stilettos & Jeans featuring "Bobby V"

Ice Cube – I Am The West (2010)
"Too West Coast" &
"All Day Everyday"

2011
WC-Revenge of the Barracuda (2011)
"Revenge of the Barracuda (intro)"
"That's What I'm Talkin' Bout"
"You Know Me" featuring Ice Cube & Young Maylay
"Reality Show"

Young Maylay (2011)
"Mic It" (producers)

Ledisi-Pieces of Me
"One Step Ahead" (iTunes Bonus track)
Bass Guitar, Keyboards

Mindless Behavior Interscope (2011)
"Can I Be Yours" (unreleased)
"My Girl Remix" featuring Ciara, Lil Twist, Tyga & Akon
"Christmas with My Girl"
"Ms. Right Club/Dance Remix" featuring Chipmunk

Professor Break Speed
"Toy Jack Pot"
multi instrumentalist

Soopafly- Best Kept Secret 
"Best Kept Secret"featuring Goldie loc, Maylay & Kokane 
- Bass guitar & additional instrumentation

2012
Nick Hagelin "Ex Games"
all music & programming.
with Walter Millsap III

Turf Talk (2012)
multiple tracks
"Do Me Right" feat. R.O.D.

Young Maylay (2012)
multiple tracks

The Chicken Hill Project (2012)
Produced and Mixed

Mindless Behavior 
"Hello" video dance break
 
Mr & Mrs. Fresh
producers
"My Baby"
"Fit You in My Plans"
"Fresh Everything"
"Haterism" featuring Issa Thompson (unreleased)

Miguel (singer)
"Every Minute You're Gone (torture)- demo 
written by Diane Warren
-producer

Jacob Latimore
"Repeat" (demo)
written by Diane Warren
-producer

Brandy- Put It Down featuring Chris Brown (Dance Remix)
(unreleased)
-producer

2013

Mindless Behavior- All Around the World
producers with Walter Millsap III, programing
"All Around The World"
"AllAround The World (Remix)"
"Lose it (Lean)" featuring Soulja Boy
"Pretty Girl" featuring Lil Twist & Jacob Latimore
"Girl Like You" (additional drum programing)

Ledisi – Loud Speaker – Something About Us (TBA)
producers, multi instrumentalist

2014
Fifth Harmony 
Tour set music & Programming.

Keri Hilson  
"XOXO" (unreleased)

Ice Cube – Everythang's Corrupt
"Take What We Want"
"Non Believers"
"Respect Your Elders"
"Ye Without Sin (unreleased)"

DJ SN1 - 
"Rachet Love"

Gerald Haddon - 
"Awesome God" (additional programming)

Danetra Moore  
"All I Can Do Is Pray"(composer/producer. Co-produced by Puretonez Productions)

Turf Talk 
"P---- Wasn't That Bomb" (unreleased)

Allday (featured in the film All Cheerleaders Die )
"Everday"
"Nom Nom Nom"
"Medication"

Tinashe-Jimmy Kimmel Live Performance 
"2 On" Live performance set (bass, keyboards, drum programming, engineering)
"Pretend" Live performance set (bass, keyboards, drum programming, engineering)

Brandy Norwood- BET HipHop Awards 2014 Live performance set (bass, additional keyboards, drum programming)
"I Wanna Be Down Remix" featuring Queen Latifah, MC Lyte, Yo-Yo (rapper)

Tinashe-Live set Producer
Soultrain Awards Performance
Songs- Pretend, Pretend (Dance Version), 2 On- All Live Instruments by Hallway Productionz

2015

Tinashe- LIVE set Producer
"All Hands On Deck"- (All Instruments (Bass, guitar, keys, synths, Drum programming) except Live drums)
The Conan O' Brien Show
Good Morning America
Powerhouse LA
Nicki Minaj's Pinkprint Tour

Tinashe
"Aquarius"-Live Tour/Show Intro 
All Instruments (Bass, guitar, keys, synths, Drum programming) except Live drums

Blackalicious-Imani Vol. 1
"Blacka"-Bass

"On Fire Tonight"-(Bass, Guitar, Keys)

"The Sun"-(Bass & Synths)

"Inspired By" featuring Bosko - Producer with Chief Xcel, Bass, synths, guitar

"We Did It Again"- (Bass, Keys, Synths)

"I Like The Way You Talk"- (Bass, Guitar, Keys, Synths)

"Twist Of Time"- (Co-writer, Bass, Piano, Synths)

"The Blow Up"- (Bass, Guitar, Keys, Synths)

"Love's Gonna Save The Day"- (Bass, Piano, Keys, Synths)

"Alpha And Omega"- (Synths)

"The Hour Glass"- (Bass, Guitar, Keys, Synths)

E-40-Poverty and Prosperity
"The End" featuring Krizz Kaliko & Jubu Smith
producer. All instruments by Hallway.
solo guitar by Jubu Smith

Angie Stone-Dream
"Clothes Don't Make A Man"
co-producer with Walter Millsap III 
All Instruments by Hallway

"Dream"
co-producer with Walter Millsap III 
All Instruments by Hallway

"2 Bad Habits"
co-producer with Walter Millsap III 
All Instruments by Hallway

"Quits"
co-producer with Walter Millsap III 
All Instruments by Hallway

"Forget About Me"
co-producer with Walter Millsap III 
All Instruments by Hallway

"Didn't Break Me" 
co-producer with Walter Millsap III 
All Instruments by Hallway

All instruments: (bass, guitar, piano, organ, strings, synths, horn programming/Arrangement, percussion, drums, drum programming)

Kenex-Single
"No Bammer" featuring Nef The Pharaoh

2016
Mindless Behavior- #OfficialMBMusic

"I Want Dat"
co-producer with Walter Millsap III
All music by Hallway

"Freaks Only"
co-producer with Walter Millsap III
All music by Hallway

"Blur"
co-producer with Walter Millsap III
All music by Hallway

"Come Up"
co-producer with Walter Millsap III
All music by Hallway

"Muzik"
co-producer with Walter Millsap III
All music by Hallway

"11s"
co-producer with Walter Millsap III
All music by Hallway

"My Bad"
co-producer with Walter Millsap III
All music by Hallway

David Hollister
The Manuscript
"Receipts"

"Oh Ya Ya"

"One Great Love"

"Barbershop"

"Geometry"

All music & instruments played & produced by Teak Underdue

Brandy Norwood
Slayana World Tour
Tour Music Producer:
"Bestfriend" (Trap version) (Brandy Album)
"Shoop" (Whitney Houston Tribute)
"Broken Hearted" (Brandy Album)
"I Thought" (Afrodisiac Album)
"Necessary" (Afrodisiac Album)

Destiny Rogers
Never Thought

2017
Jaheim-W.A.R. album
9 songs produced with Walter Millsap III

Huntar-Pony Remix feat Gucci Mane

Chicken Hill Project Two whole album produced, recorded, mixed by Teak & Dee

2018
Ice Cube-Everythangs Corrupt
Super OG
Can You Dig It?
Non Believers

Billboard Bear-The Essentials
Tight Rope
What You Like feat Bueno
My Kind of Girl feat Rrari
GoodLife
Superstar feat Moonshyne Brown
First Luv
Seasons
Girlfriend feat Kenex
Heartbreak
Destiny
My Rose
Album Produced,Mix,Mastered,Recorded & All Instruments By Teak & Dee

Kenex-Iconic
Iconic
Genesis 1:3
Every Week feat Slimmy B SOB X RBE & Yelly
Co-produced by Teak
No Bammer feat Nef The Pharaoh & Samyell
Never Forget feat Complex
My Heart Pt2 
Money On The Table feat Jayrah Gibson & Layzie Bone
We In The Money
Patience
Album Co-Executive Produced, Produced, Arranged, Mix, Mastered by Teak & Dee

2019

Dee Hallway Productionz-The Definition
Entire Album Mix, Mastered, Produced by Teak & Dee

Angie Stone-Full Circle
"Gonna Have To Be You"
co-producer with Walter Millsap III 
All Instruments by Hallway except electric guitar & brass horns

Angie Stone-Full Circle
"Dinosaur"
co-producer with Walter Millsap III 
All Instruments by Hallway

2020

Toni Braxton
"Do It Remix"

DoorDash- Blackalicious Commercial

2021

Ice Cube-"Trying To Maintain"
Trying To Maintain
producer

Redman (rapper)-TBA
Candice Nelson (songwriter)-TBA
Lyrics Born-Album co-producer
Young Maylay
Latoya London 
Silly

Video Game

Television Features

Filmography

Awards and nominations

References

External links
https://web.archive.org/web/20081120051757/http://www.209vibe.com/artists/view/48
http://www.hiphopdx.com/index/news/id.7971/title.lench-mob-producers-talk-ice-cube-new-projects
https://web.archive.org/web/20080915070449/http://raptalk.net/website/content/view/709/54/
http://www.icecube.com/?em28=437_-1__0_~0_-1_9_2009_0_0&content=news
http://hiphopnews.yuku.com/topic/853
http://www.djbooth.net/index/tracks/review/ice-cube-ft-musiq-soulchild-why-me/
http://www.rapreviews.com/interview/teak2008.html
http://www.discogs.com/artist/Teak+Underdue
http://www.vervemusicgroup.com/artist/blog/detail.aspx?did=58&aid=6705
http://www.popmatters.com/music/reviews/b/blackalicious-craft.shtml
http://www.cbn.com/cbnmusic/news/042508dovewinners.aspx
http://cinema.theiapolis.com/movie-0DEM/freedom-writers/
http://prodby.altervista.org/producer_list.php?producer=Teak%20The%20Beatsmith
http://www.mobygames.com/game/ps3/tony-hawks-proving-ground/credits
http://chiefxcel.tumblr.com/post/7819451784/one-step-ahead-ledisi-production-by-chief-xcel
http://www.allmusic.com/album/dream-mw0002882681

Hip hop duos
Hip hop record producers
Musicians from California